The Colonial Laws Validity Act 1865 (28 & 29 Vict. c. 63) is an Act of the Parliament of the United Kingdom. Its long title is "An Act to remove Doubts as to the Validity of Colonial Laws".

The purpose of the Act was to remove any apparent inconsistency between local (colonial) and British ("imperial") legislation.  Thus it confirmed that colonial legislation (provided it had been passed in the proper manner) was to have full effect within the colony, limited only to the extent that it was not in contradiction with ("repugnant to") any Act of Parliament that contained powers which extended beyond the boundaries of the United Kingdom to include that colony.  This had the effect of clarifying and strengthening the position of colonial legislatures, while at the same time restating their ultimate subordination to the Westminster Parliament.

Until the passage of the Act, a number of colonial statutes had been struck down by local judges on the grounds of repugnancy to English laws, whether or not those English laws had been intended by Parliament to be effective in the colony. This had been a particular problem for the government in South Australia, where Justice Benjamin Boothby had struck down local statutes on numerous occasions in the colony's Supreme Court.

By the mid-1920s, the British government accepted that the dominions should have full legislative autonomy.  Accordingly, the imperial Parliament passed the Statute of Westminster, which repealed the application of the Colonial Laws Validity Act 1865 to the dominions (i.e., Australia, Canada, the Irish Free State, New Zealand, Newfoundland, and the Union of South Africa).

The Statute of Westminster took effect immediately in Canada, the Irish Free State and South Africa. Australia adopted the Statute in 1942 with the passing of the Statute of Westminster Adoption Act 1942, with retroactive effect to 3 September 1939, the start of World War II. The Colonial Laws Validity Act 1865 continued to have application in individual Australian states until the Australia Act 1986 came into effect in 1986.

New Zealand adopted the Statute of Westminster in 1947.

Newfoundland never adopted the Statute of Westminster. Instead, facing grave financial difficulties as a result of the Great Depression, Newfoundland gave up responsible government in 1934. The Colonial Laws Validity Act continued to apply to Newfoundland, which was from then on ruled by an appointed Governor and Commission of Government until, in 1949, Newfoundland joined Canada as its tenth province.

Elsewhere, the Colonial Laws Validity Act remains in force, and helps to define the relationship between Acts of Parliament and laws passed in self-governing British territories, as well as the legality of decisions made by territorial legislatures and governments. The power to amend the Colonial Laws Validity Act rests with the Parliament of the United Kingdom.

See also
 Statute of Westminster 1931
 Canada Act 1982
 Australia Act 1986
 Constitution Act 1986

External links 
 
 Official text of the Colonial Laws Validity Act 1865, as originally enacted, from the Office of Public Sector Information.
 The text of the statute

Notes

References

Further reading
  
  

United Kingdom Acts of Parliament 1865
Constitution of Canada
Constitution of New Zealand
Australian constitutional law
1865 in British law
British Empire
Governance of the British Empire
History of the Commonwealth of Nations